Moelleriopsis poppei is a species of sea snail, a marine gastropod mollusk, unassigned in the superfamily Seguenzioidea.

Distribution
This species is found in the Weddell Sea, Antarctica.

Description 
The maximum recorded shell length is 2.15 mm.

Habitat 
Minimum recorded depth is 2579 m. Maximum recorded depth is 2579 m.

References

External links
 To World Register of Marine Species

poppei
Gastropods described in 2012